Nők Lapja ("Women's Magazine") is a Hungarian weekly women's magazine currently published by . Established in 1949, it remains one of the leading weekly magazines in Hungary. As of 2020, its editor-in-chief is Andrea Vékási.

History
On 1 October 1949, the magazine ceased publication. Shortly, Asszonyok was replaced by Nők Lapja, with its first issue published on 20 October 1949.

On 21 October 2011, Andrea Vékási replaced Gabriella Molnár as editor-in-chief.

References

External links
 Official website
 Nők Lapja at Central Médiacsoport Zrt.

1949 establishments in Hungary
Hungarian-language magazines
Magazines established in 1949
Magazines published in Budapest
Weekly magazines published in Hungary
Women's magazines